Søvnløs is the fourth studio album by Norwegian hard rock band Skambankt. It was recorded in February 2010 at Athletic Sound in Halden, and mixed by Jørgen Træen in Bergen. The working title "Åndelig terror" ("Spiritual Terror") stemmed from a quote by a senior citizen when she was presented with a sample of Skambankt's music. The final title "Søvnløs" ("Sleepless"), however, was chosen because the album was recorded mostly late at night because this is the time when new ideas develop.

The first single Mantra was released on May 17, 2010.

Track listing
Kaos, så inferno (Chaos, then inferno)
Jesus av vår tid (Jesus of our times)
Mantra
Amnesti (Amnesty)
En lang strek (A long line)
Nattergal (Nightingale)
Født på ny (Born again)
Berlin 
Kvelertak! (Stranglehold!)
Retrett (Retreat)

Chart

References 

2010 albums
Skambankt albums